Jayne Torvill, OBE (born 7 October 1957) is a British professional ice dancer and former competitor. With Christopher Dean, she won a gold medal at the 1984 Winter Olympics and a bronze medal at the 1994 Winter Olympics, becoming one of the oldest figure skating Olympic medalists.

Early life
Torvill was born in Clifton, Nottingham, England, and grew up in Nottingham. She attended Clifton Hall Girls' Grammar School and worked in the city as an insurance clerk at Norwich Union.

Ice skating

She became hooked on ice skating at the age of 8 following an after-school trip to the local ice rink. In 1971 at age 14 Torvill became the British National Pairs Champion with her then-partner Michael Hutchinson. 

After parting from Hutchinson, Torvill continued to skate on her own for a while before teaming up with Christopher Dean in 1975. On placing 5th in the 1980 Winter Olympics at Lake Placid, New York, Dean gave up his job as a policeman and Torvill gave up hers as an insurance clerk to skate together full-time.

Torvill and Dean's free programme at the 1984 Sarajevo Winter Olympics, performed to the music of Maurice Ravel's Boléro, became world-famous. They received twelve perfect 6.0 marks, one of five occasions they were awarded all perfect scores for artistic impression. It was one of the most popular achievements in the history of British sport, watched by a British television audience of 24 million people. Since the time limit was four minutes and ten seconds and their music was four minutes 28 seconds, they began on their knees and moved their bodies to the music for 18 seconds before starting to skate.

Torvill and Dean turned professional after their 1984 Olympic win and under then existing Olympic Committee rules their professional status made them ineligible to compete in the Olympics again. However, in 1993 the International Skating Union relaxed the rules for professional skaters, allowing the pair to participate in the 1994 Winter Olympics in Lillehammer where they won a bronze medal.

Torvill took a seven-year break from skating from 1998–2005. In January 2006, she and Dean began starring in the ITV show Dancing on Ice. Each year, the show runs from January to March and then goes on tour to arenas across the United Kingdom. In November 2011, Torvill said, "the standard each year has gotten higher and higher, which is exciting for us – to think what we can achieve with people who have never skated or are relatively unknown to skating."

Torvill and Dean were ambassadors for the 2012 European Figure Skating Championships in Sheffield, England. In February 2014, Torvill and Dean visited Sarajevo for the 30th anniversary of the 1984 Olympics, and recreated their Bolero routine in the same arena where they won the gold.

Competitive results

Pair skating with Hutchinson

Amateur results with Dean

Professional results with Dean

Professional programs

Amateur programs

Personal life
Torvill currently resides in Heathfield, East Sussex, England, with her husband Phil Christensen and their adopted children Kieran and Jessica.

In 2021 Torvill took part in an episode of DNA Journey where she found out she was related to footballer Charlie Bicknell, a cousin on her mother's side.

In popular culture 
Torvill was portrayed by Poppy Lee Friar in the 2018 biopic Torvill & Dean.

See also
Torvill and Dean

References

External links

 Torvill & Dean official site
 
 
 

BBC Sports Personality of the Year winners
British sportswomen
English female ice dancers
English Olympic medallists
European Figure Skating Championships medalists
Figure skaters at the 1980 Winter Olympics
Figure skaters at the 1984 Winter Olympics
Figure skaters at the 1994 Winter Olympics
Medalists at the 1984 Winter Olympics
Medalists at the 1994 Winter Olympics
Officers of the Order of the British Empire
Olympic bronze medallists for Great Britain
Olympic figure skaters of Great Britain
Olympic gold medallists for Great Britain
Olympic medalists in figure skating
1957 births
Living people
People from Clifton, Nottinghamshire
Sportspeople from Nottinghamshire
Sportspeople from Nottingham
World Figure Skating Championships medalists
People from Heathfield, East Sussex